
Gmina Iwierzyce is a rural gmina (administrative district) in Ropczyce-Sędziszów County, Subcarpathian Voivodeship, in south-eastern Poland.

Villages
Gmina Iwierzyce contains the villages and settlements of Będzienica, Bystrzyca, Iwierzyce, Nockowa, Olchowa, Olimpów, Sielec, Wiercany and Wiśniowa.

Neighbouring gminas
Gmina Iwierzyce is bordered by the gminas of Boguchwała, Czudec, Sędziszów Małopolski, Świlcza and Wielopole Skrzyńskie.

References
Polish official population figures 2006

Iwierzyce
Ropczyce-Sędziszów County